Pigcawayan, officially the Municipality of Pigcawayan (Maguindanaon: Inged nu Pigkawayan, Jawi: ايڠايد نو ڤيڬكاوين; Iranun: Inged a Pigkawayan, ايڠايد ا ڤيڬكاوين; ;), is a 1st class municipality in the province of Cotabato, Philippines. According to the 2020 census, it has a population of 52,744 people.

It is sometimes spelled Pigkawayan.

History
Before its creation as a separate and independent Political Unit, Pigcawayan together with Alamada and Libungan were component barangays of Midsayap. Pigcawayan, however at that time was more progressive than the two mentioned.

How Pigcawayan got its name remains undocumented, however two versions were given by the early settlers and passed from one generation to another.

The first version was that the place now known as Pigcawayan was a battleground for the Iranuns and the Maguindanaons. Due to this fighting the inhabitants would abandon the place to be occupied by the victors. From this evolved the Maguindanaon word "Pigawaan," which meant an abandoned place.

The second version, refers to an incident when an American school superintendent visited the place. The superintendent encountered people roasting a pig with the use of bamboo pole rotated over live charcoal. The words "pig bamboo," as said by the superintendent, were translated into the local dialect Pigcawayan the present name of the municipality.

Geography
Pigcawayan is the last municipality of Cotabato Province coming from Davao City to Cotabato City.

Barangays
Pigcawayan is politically subdivided into 40 barangays.

Note

Climate

Demographics

Economy

The municipality is primarily an agricultural area. Common industrial activities are rice and corn mills. There are 11 rice mills (electric operated) found in Poblacion (2), Tubon (4), North and South Manuangan (2), Upper Baguer (10), Balogo (1), and Capayuran (1). Aside from these, there are also 2) Baby Cono/Kiskisan that can be found in (13) barangays.

Processed milled rice by Rice Mills are usually brought/sold to Cotabato City, Davao City and in some parts of South Cotabato. Milled rice produced by "Kiskisan/Baby Cono" were usually for households consumption by residents of barangays.

Cottage industries include furniture shops that use wood, bamboo and rattan, as well as rice grinder, mini sawmill and machine shops.

Tourism
Kaway-kaway Pigcayawan is the proposed tourism brand of the municipality. 

 Spanish Tower located at Libungan-Torreta, Pigcawayan. It is a historical place.
 Saljay Integrated Farm located at Presbitero, Pigcawayan; farming and agricultural trips.
 The Shrine of Virgin Mary, located at Rogonan, New Panay, Pigcawayan. 
 Payong-Payong Cave, located at Payong-Payong, Pigcawayan; caving.
 Bual Spring, located at Kimarayag, Pigcawayan; swimming.
 Payong-Payong Falls located at Auxiliary, Payong-Payong, Pigcawayan. The waterfalls drop from 8–12 meters high with its source coming from a wide river.
 Agustin Swimming Pool Resort located at Tigbawan, Pigcawayan; camping, swimming and picnic sites.
 Kagiringan Falls located at Kimarayag, Pigcawayan; camping and trekking.
 Rapu-Rapu Falls located at Anick, Pigcawayan. The falls drop into a natural round pool called "kawa-kawa" with an estimated 3 meters in diameter.
 Malagakit Lake Resort Malagakit, Pigcawayan. The lake was judged as the cleanest and greenest inland body of water in the Philippines in 1995.
 Lampaki Cave located at Kimarayag, Pigcawayan. The entrance is 3 meters in height with formations of stalactites and stalagmites inside as well as scattered thick guano. There is a small hole on the top through which the rays of the sun pass.
 Kimarayag Cave located at Campo 1, Kimarayag, Pigcawayan. The cave has stalactites and stalagmites formed like a teeth of a whale.
 Belle's Farm & Resort located at Midpapan I, Pigcawayan; swimming, events (weddings, family reunions, birthdays, etc.)

References

External links
Pigcawayan Profile at the DTI Cities and Municipalities Competitive Index
[ Philippine Standard Geographic Code]
Philippine Census Information

Municipalities of Cotabato